Vernouillet is a commune in the Yvelines department in the Île-de-France in north-central France.

Population

Twin towns – sister cities

Vernouillet is twinned with:
 Hainburg, Germany (1962)
 Alberndorf im Pulkautal, Austria (1972)
 Trumau, Austria (1977)
 Yarm, England, United Kingdom (1985)

See also
Communes of the Yvelines department

References

Communes of Yvelines